Tilioideae is a flowering plant subfamily in the family Malvaceae, though it was formerly considered a large group, placed at family rank and called Tiliaceae.

Within the framework of the Angiosperm Phylogeny Groups III & IV systems, an extended family Malvaceae is recognized by uniting the core Malvales of the Cronquist system - Bombacaceae, Malvaceae sensu stricto, Sterculiaceae and Tiliaceae.  Within the APG classification, Malvaceae contains a clade of 3 living genera placed as the subfamily Tilioideae.

Genera and species
The subfamily includes Tilia, Craigia, and Mortoniodendron.  The majority of other genera historically included in the family rank "Tiliaceae" have been moved into two other subfamilies of Malvaceae, the Brownlowioideae and Grewioideae.

Craigia

 †Craigia bronnii
 †Craigia hainanensis
 Craigia kwangsiensis
 †Craigia oregonensis
 Craigia yunnanensis

Mortoniodendron

 Mortoniodendron abelianum Al.Rodr.
 Mortoniodendron anisophyllum (Standl.) Standl. & Steyerm.
 Mortoniodendron apetalum Al. Rodr.
 Mortoniodendron cauliflorum Al. Rodr.
 Mortoniodendron guatemalense Standl. & Steyerm.
 Mortoniodendron hirsutum Standl.
 Mortoniodendron longipedunculatum Al. Rodr.
 Mortoniodendron membranaceum Standl. & Steyerm.
 Mortoniodendron moralesii Al.Rodr.
 Mortoniodendron palaciosii Miranda
 Mortoniodendron pentagonum (Donn. Sm.) Miranda
 Mortoniodendron ruizii Miranda
 Mortoniodendron sulcatum Lundell
 Mortoniodendron uxpanapense Dorr & T. Wendt
 Mortoniodendron vestitum Lundell

Tilia

 Tilia americana L.
 Tilia amurensis
 Tilia caroliniana
 Tilia chinensis
 Tilia chingiana Hu & W.C.Cheng
 Tilia cordata Mill.
 Tilia dasystyla Steven
 Tilia henryana Szyszyl.
 Tilia hupehensis
 Tilia insularis
 Tilia intonsa
 Tilia japonica
 †Tilia johnsoni Wolfe & Wehr Ypresian
 Tilia kiusiana
 Tilia mandshurica
 Tilia maximowicziana
 Tilia miqueliana
 Tilia mongolica Maxim.
 Tilia nasczokinii
 Tilia nobilis
 Tilia oliveri
 Tilia paucicostata
 Tilia platyphyllos Scop.
 Tilia rubra
 Tilia tomentosa Moench
 Tilia tuan Szyszyl.

References 

 
Rosid subfamilies